Hugh of Burgundy may refer to six different Dukes of Burgundy:
Hugh the Black (died 952)
Hugh I, Duke of Burgundy (died 1093)
Hugh II, Duke of Burgundy (died 1143)
Hugh III, Duke of Burgundy (died 1192)
Hugh IV, Duke of Burgundy (died 1271)
 Hugh V, Duke of Burgundy (died 1315)

Hugh of Burgundy may also refer to a member of the family of the Counts of Burgundy:
Hugh, Count of Burgundy (died 1266)